The 17th British Academy Video Game Awards was hosted by the British Academy of Film and Television Arts on 25 March 2021 to honour the best video games of 2020. It was held as a live-streamed event due to the ongoing COVID-19 pandemic, with Elle Osili-Wood as host. This was Wood's first time hosting the ceremony, taking over from Dara Ó Briain who had hosting the BAFTAs ten times between 2008 and 2020. The nominees were announced on 2 March 2021, with The Last of Us Part II receiving a record-setting fourteen nominations, beating the eleven nominations received by Control and Death Stranding at the previous ceremony. Hades was named as Best Game, as well as winning the most awards (five).

Nominees and winners 
The nominations were announced on 2 March 2021. The winners were announced through a livestreamed presentation on 25 March 2021, due to ongoing concerns from the COVID-19 pandemic.

BAFTA Fellowship: Siobhan Reddy

Games with multiple nominations and wins

Nominations

Wins

References

British Academy Games Awards ceremonies
British Academy Games
British Academy Games
British Academy Games
British Academy Games Awards 17